Dock is a given name. Notable people with the name include:

Dock Boggs (1898–1971), American folk singer and banjoist
Dock Ellis (1945–2008), American baseball pitcher
Dock J. Jordan (1866–1943), American lawyer and educator
Dock Walsh (1901–1967), American banjoist

See also
Doc (nickname)